Fariborz Moradi was an Iranian footballer who played as a midfielder for Persepolis and the Iran national football team.

References

1964 births
2008 deaths
Iranian footballers
Iran international footballers
Persepolis F.C. players
Association football midfielders